Newar may refer to:

 Newar people
 Newar language
 Newar cuisine
 Newar script

Language and nationality disambiguation pages